In mathematics, the Radon–Nikodym theorem is a result in measure theory that expresses the relationship between two measures defined on the same measurable space. A measure is a set function that assigns a consistent magnitude to the measurable subsets of a measurable space. Examples of a measure include area and volume, where the subsets are sets of points; or the probability of an event, which is a subset of possible outcomes within a wider probability space.

One way to derive a new measure from one already given is to assign a density to each point of the space, then integrate over the measurable subset of interest. This can be expressed as

where  is the new measure being defined for any measurable subset  and the function  is the density at a given point. The integral is with respect to an existing measure , which may often be the canonical Lebesgue measure on the real line  or the n-dimensional Euclidean space  (corresponding to our standard notions of length, area and volume).

The Radon–Nikodym theorem essentially states that, under certain conditions, any measure  can be expressed in this way with respect to another measure  on the same space. An important application is in probability theory, leading to the probability density function of a random variable.

In 1936 Hans Freudenthal generalized the Radon–Nikodym theorem by proving the Freudenthal spectral theorem, a result in Riesz space theory; this contains the Radon–Nikodym theorem as a special case.

All Hilbert spaces have the Radon–Nikodym property.

Formal description

Radon–Nikodym theorem
The Radon–Nikodym theorem involves a measurable space  on which two σ-finite measures are defined,  and  
It states that, if  (that is, if  is absolutely continuous with respect to ), then there exists a -measurable function  such that for any measurable set

Radon–Nikodym derivative
The choice of notation and the name of the function reflects the fact that the function is analogous to a derivative in calculus in the sense that it describes the rate of change of density of one measure with respect to another (the way the Jacobian determinant is used in multivariable integration).

Extension to signed or complex measures

Examples 
Then, .
Then,  is not absolutely-continuous with respect to  since it assigns non-zero measure to zero-length points.

Properties
 Let ν, μ, and λ be σ-finite measures on the same measurable space. If ν ≪ λ and μ ≪ λ (ν and μ are both absolutely continuous with respect to λ), then 
 If ν ≪ μ ≪ λ, then 
 In particular, if μ ≪ ν and ν ≪ μ, then 
 If ν is a finite signed or complex measure, then

Applications

Probability theory
The theorem is very important in extending the ideas of probability theory from probability masses and probability densities defined over real numbers to probability measures defined over arbitrary sets. It tells if and how it is possible to change from one probability measure to another. Specifically, the probability density function of a random variable is the Radon–Nikodym derivative of the induced measure with respect to some base measure (usually the Lebesgue measure for continuous random variables).

For example, it can be used to prove the existence of conditional expectation for probability measures. The latter itself is a key concept in probability theory, as conditional probability is just a special case of it.

Financial mathematics
Amongst other fields, financial mathematics uses the theorem extensively, in particular via the Girsanov theorem. Such changes of probability measure are the cornerstone of the rational pricing of derivatives and are used for converting actual probabilities into those of the risk neutral probabilities.

Information divergences

 The Kullback–Leibler divergence from ν to μ is defined to be 
 For α > 0, α ≠ 1 the Rényi divergence of order α from ν to μ is defined to be

The assumption of σ-finiteness
The Radon–Nikodym theorem above makes the assumption that the measure μ with respect to which one computes the rate of change of ν is σ-finite.

Negative example
Here is an example when μ is not σ-finite and the Radon–Nikodym theorem fails to hold.

Consider the Borel σ-algebra on the real line. Let the counting measure, of a Borel set  be defined as the number of elements of  if  is finite, and  otherwise. One can check that  is indeed a measure. It is not -finite, as not every Borel set is at most a countable union of finite sets. Let  be the usual Lebesgue measure on this Borel algebra.

Assume that the Radon–Nikodym theorem holds, that is, for some measurable function  one has

for all Borel sets. Taking  to be a singleton set, and using the above equality, one finds

for all real numbers . This implies that the function , and therefore the Lebesgue measure , is zero, which is a contradiction.

Positive result

Proof
This section gives a measure-theoretic proof of the theorem. There is also a functional-analytic proof, using Hilbert space methods, that was first given by von Neumann.

The supremum of all such functions, along with the monotone convergence theorem, then furnishes the Radon–Nikodym derivative. Once the result is established for finite measures, extending to -finite, signed, and complex measures can be done naturally. The details are given below.

For finite measures

Let  be the set of those extended-value measurable functions  such that:

, since it contains at least the zero function. Now let , and suppose  is an arbitrary measurable set, and define:

Then one has

and therefore, .

Now, let  be a sequence of functions in  such that

By replacing  with the maximum of the first  functions, one can assume that the sequence  is increasing. Let  be an extended-valued function defined as

By Lebesgue's monotone convergence theorem, one has

for each , and hence, .

Proving equality  Now, since ,

To prove equality, we show that .

Suppose ; then, since  is finite, there is an  such that . A convenient approach is to use the Hahn decomposition  for the signed measure .

Note then that for every  one has , and hence,

Also, note that  as desired; for if , then (since  is absolutely continuous in relation to ) , so  and

contradicting the fact that .

Then, since also

 and satisfies

This is impossible because it violates the definition of a supremum; therefore, the initial assumption that  must be false. Hence, as desired.

Restricting to finite values  Now, since  is -integrable, the set  is -null.

then  has the desired properties.

Uniqueness  As for the uniqueness, let  be measurable functions satisfying

for every measurable set . Then,  is -integrable, and

It follows that

For -finite positive measures
For each , by the finite case, there is a -measurable function  such that

The sum  of those functions is then the required function such that . 

For signed and complex measures
If  is a -finite signed measure, then it can be Hahn–Jordan decomposed as  where one of the measures is finite.

Clearly,  is the required function.

The Lebesgue decomposition theorem
Lebesgue's decomposition theorem shows that the assumptions of the Radon–Nikodym theorem can be found even in a situation which is seemingly more general. The Radon–Nikodym theorem can then be applied to the pair .

See also
Girsanov theorem
Radon–Nikodym set

Notes

References
  Contains a proof for vector measures assuming values in a Banach space.
  Contains a lucid proof in case the measure ν is not σ-finite.
 
  Contains a proof of the generalisation.
 

Theorems in measure theory
Articles containing proofs
Generalizations of the derivative
Integral representations